Secondary Highway 539A, commonly referred to as Highway 539A, is a provincially maintained secondary highway in the Canadian province of Ontario, located within Nipissing District. The route was later truncated, and now extends for only 5.8 kilometres, with the remainder of the former route having been renumbered as an extension of Highway 805.

Route description 
Highway 539A begins at a junction with its parent route, Highway 539. Drivers on Highway 539 must turn to remain on that route, while southbound Highway 539A becomes eastbound Highway 539 to Field. Northbound, drivers round a long curve and enter the community of River Valley. The highway crosses the railbed of a former rail spur, exits the community and crosses the Temagami River. The highway gradually curves to the northwest and hugs the bank of the Sturgeon River.

History 

Although Highway 539 was designated in 1956, and the road that is now Highway 539A existed, the route was not designated at that time.
The route first appears on the 1958 Official Road Map of Ontario as a short spur of Highway 539 into River Valley.
In 1962, Highway 805 was designated within Sudbury District. In order to connect it with the rest of the provincial highway network, Highway 539A was extended northwest to the Nipissing – Sudbury district boundary.
It still follows this same routing today.

Major intersections

References 

539A
Roads in Nipissing District